Victor Emmanuel Smith is a Ghanaian diplomat and politician, who is a member of the National Democratic Congress. He served as Ghana's High Commissioner to the United Kingdom from 2014 and 2017. He also served as Ghana's ambassador to the Czech Republic during John Evans Atta Mills government.

Politics 
He worked as a Director of Public Affairs and a special aide to Former President Jerry Rawlings until 2008. He was later appointed by John Evans Atta Mills to serve as Ghana's ambassador to the Czech Republic. In 2014, John Dramani Mahama appointed to serve as Ghana's High Commissioner to the United Kingdom. He served in that role till 2017, after his party had lost the election he was replaced with Papa Owusu-Ankomah

Personal life 
He is the younger brother of Joseph Henry Smith, a former Ambassador of Ghana to the United States.

References 

Living people
High Commissioners of Ghana to the United Kingdom
National Democratic Congress (Ghana) politicians
Year of birth missing (living people)